Dalia is a common feminine name in Persian (Parsi: دالیا), Arabic (Arabic: داليا) and Hebrew (Hebrew: דַּלְיָה).

There are several biblical and Talmudic references. However, confusion arose among Hebrew speakers  Dalia is not a similar meaning with the name of the flower Dahlia, named in honor of Anders Dahl, a Swedish botanist, by Spanish naturalist Antonio José de Cavanilles, director of the Real Jardín Botánico de Madrid of 18th century. Dahlia is a native flower of Mexico and the national flower of the country. However, in Mexico, it is spelled as "Dalia" another derivative of its official name which is commonly used and popular in Spanish speaking countries.

Dalia is a popular feminine name in Lithuania, meaning 'destiny' or 'fate' and derived from Lithuanian pagan traditions. It is the name of the ancient Lithuanian goddess of destiny.

Notable people with the name include 
Dalia Contreras (born 1983), Venezuelan taekwando practitioner
Dalia El Behery (born 1970), Egyptian actress, model, TV presenter, and Miss Egypt 1990
Dalia Hertz (born 1942), Israeli poet
Dalia Mogahed (born 1974), American Muslim scholar and adviser to President Barack Obama
Dalia Ibelhauptaitė (born 1967), Lithuanian opera, theatre, and film director, producer and playwright
Dalia Leinartė (born 1958), Lithuanian member and former Chair of the UN Committee on the Elimination of Discrimination against Women (CEDAW)
Dalia Grybauskaitė (born 1956), the first female President of Lithuania from 2009 until 2019.
Dalia Itzik (born 1952), Israeli politician
Dalia Rabin-Pelossof (born 1950), Israeli politician
Dalia Dorner (born 1934), former Justice of the Supreme Court of Israel
Dale Messick (1906–2005), born Dalia Messick, creator of the comic strip Brenda Starr
Dhalia (1925–1991), Indonesian actress

Arabic feminine given names
Hebrew feminine given names
Lithuanian feminine given names